Tito and the Birds is a 2018 Brazilian animated film.

Summary
The film is an eccentric but impassioned allegory about fear in Brazil affecting a boy named Tito who loves helping his scientist dad Rufus with his inventions (despite his worrisome skeptic mom); the latest involving a machine that can understand bird songs which break down thus resulting in separation. Years later, the fear epidemic is spreading and Tito must resist it relying on his friends Sarah and Buiú to find a cure for his father and his research for his machine before it's too late.

Release
The film was released in Northern America on DVD and Blu-ray Disc by Shout Factory on April 23, 2019.

See also
Cinema of Brazil

References

External links

Rotten Tomatoes
Official trailer on Shout! Factory YouTube channel
Tito and the Birds on Metacritic

2018 animated films
2018 films
Brazilian animated films
Animated feature films
Animated films about birds
Films about fear